Dr Thomas Hasani "Shinyori" Chauke (born 5 February 1952) is a South African Xitsonga musician.  Chauke was granted an honorary doctorate in African languages for the role his music has played in the development of the Xitsonga language.

Early life
Chauke was born in Salema (Saselamani) Village in the Limpopo Province, South Africa. He dropped out of school at primary level (Standard 3/Grade 5) to work at a flower firm in Heidelberg, Gauteng, in 1969. He then moved to Alexandra in 1971, where he fixed swimming pools and tennis courts in neighbouring Sandton. While there he met his uncle, who was into mbaqanga music and played the Tsonga guitar, which he taught Chauke how to play. Chauke traveled back home in 1978 and fixed radio sets. He was already married with a child. Chauke had five wives, 23 children and 12 grandchildren.

Music career
Chauke started his band with 13 singers from a shebeen in the late 1970s . After a few months, only five remained. They performed at school halls to raise money to go to Johannesburg and realize the recording dream. Chauke signed a contract to record with GRC. Under GRC, the music was branded Nyoresh. He moved to Wea Records, where he got a better deal and changed his music brand from Nyoresh to Shimatsatsa ("a beautiful girl"). In 1981, he recorded his first album called Shimatsatsa no. 1 under the burner name Thomas Chauke and Shinyori Sisters. Now he hands out awards yearly in the category: Dr. Thomas Chauke's Artist of the Year for Munghana Lonene Fm. In the course of his career, Chauke has received one diamond disc, one double gold disc, six platinum disc, 11 double platinum and nine triple platinum discs.

Awards and accomplishments
 Honorary Doctor of Philosophy degree, African languages University of Venda
 South African Music Awards (SAMA) won 16 awards
 Munghana-Lonene FM Awards won more than 10 awards
 Munghana-Lonene FM Awards Special Award
 MTN SAMA 19 Lifetime Achievement Award 2013
 In 2014, Munghana Lonene FM introduced new award category, Dr Thomas Chauke Album of the year

Discography
With a career spanning over 34 years, he has released over 34 studio albums. 

Nyoresh
Shimatsatsa No. 1 - Shimatsatsa shamina
Shimatsatsa No. 2 – Don't Be Surprised
Shimatsatsa No. 3 – Bomber Mhlengwe
Shimatsatsa No. 4 - Shimatsatsa xa mina
Shimatsatsa No. 5 – Shikwamula Mazingi
Shimatsatsa No. 6 – Xibamuxa Movha
Shimatsatsa No. 7 – Suka Lovha
Shimatsatsa No. 8 – Ma jamble Sale
Shimatsatsa No. 9 – Humelela  M.K
Shimatsatsa No. 10 – Jim Na Jack
Shimatsatsa No. 11 – Hi Hanya kuvava
Shimatsatsa No. 12 – Buku Yi Hibyerile
Shimatsatsa No. 13 – Xifumi Na Lazaro
Shimatsatsa No. 14 – Suka Davulos
Shimatsatsa No. 15 – Kokwani Wa Wun'Wana
Shimatsatsa No. 16 – Sodoma Na Gomora
Shimatsatsa No. 17 – Bangi situlu
Shimatsatsa No. 18 – Mati-Endla (SAMA 1999 Winner)
Shimatsatsa No. 19 - I Mutshiveri Muni? (SAMA 2000 Winner)

Shimatsatsa No.20 – Magidi – Mbirhi (SAMA 2001 Winner)
Shimatshana No. 21 – Mpfende Mpfende (SAMA 2002 Winner)
Shimatsatsa No. 22 – Mugawula
Shimatsatsa No. 23 – Shimovhana
Shimatsatsa No. 24 – Madzolonga
Shimatsatsa No. 25 – Xidudla Kedibone
The Best Of Thomas Chauke – Volume 1
The Best Of Thomas Chauke Na Shinyori Sisters – Volume 2
Shimatsatsa No. 26 – Mavholovholo
Shimatsatsa No. 27 – Rejina
Shimatsatsa No. 28 – Swelemetee
Shimatsatas No. 29 – Xihloka Xa Maseve (SAMA 2010–Nominated)
Shimatsatsa No. 30 - Jehovha (SAMA 2011 Winner)
Shimatsatsa No. 31 – Dokodela (SAMA 2013 Winner)
Shimatsatsa No. 32 - Virus-Computer ya nhloko (SAMA 2014 Winner) "Sold a remarkable Gold within 2 Days of release"
Shimatsatsa No. 33 - Basopa
Shimatsatsa No. 34 - Xiganga (SAMA 2017 Winner)
Shimatsatsa No. 35 - Majagani

References

South African musicians
People from Limpopo
Living people
1952 births